Steven S. Crompton is a Canadian-born artist, author and designer who has worked in the role-playing and comic genres since 1981.  In the gaming industry he is best known as the artist for the Grimtooth's Traps books as well as other Catalyst role-playing game supplements, Tunnels & Trolls and the Nuclear War card game.

Education
Steven Crompton went to Arizona State University art college for two years, the Scottsdale Community College, and the Vo-Tech Commercial Art School.

Career
Starting in 1981, Steve Crompton worked as staff illustrator for Flying Buffalo Inc., and did the art and designed some of the traps in Grimtooth's Traps. He also did maps and Illustrations for numerous other RPG books and games published by the company from 1981-1985. during that period he did freelance work for Steve Jackson Games, Game Designers Workshop, Fantasy Games Unlimited, and others. 

His first widely distributed comic was Elves of Lejentia #1 - 3, in 1987. In 1991, he was hired by Todd Loren to work on Psychoman and his own creation, Demi the Demoness. The Demi comics have been in continuous publication since 1992. Demi was adapted into a live-action movie and released on dvd in 2008 and new Demi comics continue to be published.

He developed the art and marketing for the City of the Gods: Forgotten novel and related books, games and comics.

Since 2005 he has managed entire projects, contributing to all aspects of a publishing endeavor including marketing, working directly with other creators, design, writing, art, maps, pre-press, printing liaison and final delivery to the end users.  Recent examples include Deluxe Tunnels & Trolls RPG, 50th Anniversary Nuclear War (card game), Ace of Aces (picture book game) limited edition reprint, the Grimtooth's Ultimate Traps Collection an updated edition of the Mercenaries, Spies & Private Eyes RPG, and a 2nd edition of the Monsters! Monsters! RPG.

In August 2019, after the death of Flying Buffalo publisher "Rick Loomis", Steven was named the Managing Director of Flying Buffalo. He oversaw the continuation of Flying Buffalo's intellectual properties and ongoing publishing ventures. In August of 2021, Flying Buffalo's assets were sold, and a new company (WebbedSphere) took over the ownership of Flying Buffalo. Steve Crompton is currently the Art Director for Trollhalla Press Unlimited and is co-creating and working on RPG projects with "Ken St. Andre".

Art for games 
Besides Grimtooth's Traps and Nuclear War, other notable games his work has appeared include Tunnels & Trolls, Mercenaries, Spies & Private Eyes, Traveller, DCC RPG, Immortal, GURPS, Space Opera, Space: 1889, Lejentia Campaigns, Grid Iron, Lost Worlds, the Powerz Card Game, and many others.

Several of the games he has worked on have won the HG Wells "Origins Award", including Citybook, Stormhaven, Nuclear Escalation & Nuclear Proliferation card Games.  Nuclear War won the "Hall of Fame Award" as one of the best card games of all time.

Selected game bibliography 
Along with art, he also contributed to the design and writing of some of these products.

 Grimtooth's Traps  - 1981 (Flying Buffalo) 
 Catacombs of the Bear Cult - 1981 (Flying Buffalo)
 Grimtooth's Traps Too - 1982 (Flying Buffalo) 
 Citybook I: Butcher, Baker, Candlestick Maker - 1982 (Flying Buffalo) 
 Nuclear Escalation - 1983 (Flying Buffalo)
 Traveller Adventure, The - 1983 (Game Designers' Workshop)
 Alderson Yards Shipbook - 1985 Fantasy Games Unlimited
 Grimtooth's Traps Fore - 1986 (Flying Buffalo)
 Lejentia Campaigns Book 1 - 1988 (Flying Buffalo) 
 Lejentia Campaigns Book 2 - 1989 (Flying Buffalo)
 Grimtooth's Traps Ate - 1989 (Flying Buffalo) 
 Grimtooth's Traps Lite - 1991 (Flying Buffalo)
 Case of the Pacific Clipper - Mugshots 1 - 1991 (Flying Buffalo) 
 Lost World: Flaming Cherry - 1992 (Flying Buffalo)
 Lost World: Gargoyle w/ Spear - 1992 (Flying Buffalo)
 Nuclear War Booster Cards - 1993 (Flying Buffalo)
 Grimtooth's Dungeon of Doom - 1993 (Flying Buffalo)
 Maps 1 - Cities - 1993 (Flying Buffalo)
 Maps 2 - Places of Legend - 1994 (Flying Buffalo)
 Grimtooth's Traps Bazaar - 1995 (Flying Buffalo)
 Citybook VII - King's River Bridge - 1997 (Flying Buffalo)
 Nuclear Proliferation &.2nd ed  - 1990, 2003 (Flying Buffalo)
 Nuclear War Card Game 2nd ed - 2001 (Flying Buffalo)
 Wurst of Grimtooth’s Traps - 2005 (Necromancer Games)
 Weapons of Mass Destruction - 2005 (Flying Buffalo)
 Origins Poker Decks — 2007-2011 (Flying Buffalo/Game Manufacturers Association) (GAMA)
 City of the Gods Map Pack - 2013 (Flying Buffalo)
 Adventurers Compendium - 2014 (Flying Buffalo)
 Deluxe Tunnels & Trolls - 2015 (Flying Buffalo)
 Grimtooth's Ultimate TRAPS Collection - 2015 (Goodman Games)
 Agent of Death - 2016 (Flying Buffalo)
 T&T Adventures Japan - 2017 (Flying Buffalo)
 Vaults of K'Horror - 2018 (Flying Buffalo)
 Grimtooth's Trapsylvania - 2019 (Goodman Games)
 Mercenaries, Spies & Private Eyes - 2019 (Flying Buffalo)
 Alice in Weirdworld T&T solo - 2020 (Flying Buffalo)
 Monsters! Monsters! 2nd Ed. RPG - 2020 (Trollhalla Press Ultd.)
 Monsterary of Zimrala rpg book - 2022 (Trollhalla Press Ultd.)

Art for comics 
Crompton is best known for his creation Demi the Demoness and his work as editor and designer of the Carnal Comics line since 2001, with over 35 books including Frank Brunner's Carnal Delights and Carnal Comics: the Inside Story.  He has worked for Rip Off Press, Hippy Comix, Kitchen Sink Press, Cry for Dawn Productions, Revolutionary Comics and many others. He also created 100 comic-style art cards for the Topps Mars Attacks Invasion trading card series.

Selected comics bibliography

Demi the Demoness 
 Demi the Demoness #1 - 7. 1992 - 2003, Revolutionary Comics
 Demi Adventure Special #1. 1995, Rip Off Press
 Tracey Adams/Demi #1. 1995, Revisionary Press
 Demi the Demoness color strip. 1996/98, Oui magazine
 Demi meets Cassiopeia #1. 1997, Rip Off Press
 Demi & Capt. Fortune #1. 1997 Rip Off Press
 Demi & Shaundra #1. 1998, Rip Off Press
 Demi Art Card Set. 1998, Opus Graphics
 Demi's Wild Kingdom #1. 2000, Carnal/MU Press
 Demi's Strange Bedfellows #1 - 5. 2001-2015, Carnal Comics
 Demi Demoness Graphic Novel. 2006, Carnal Comics
 Demi & Vampirooni #1. 2006, Carnal Comics
 Demi the Demoness Movie. 2008,  Carnal Comics/MSD Productions
 Crimson Gash Meets Demi #1. 2009, Carnal Comics
 Demi & the Sex Squad #1. 2010, Carnal Comics
 Demi vs the Monsters of the Third Reich. 2014, Carnal Comics
 CthulhuCrisis! #1. 2019, Raven Press

Other titles 
 Lejentia Stanza #1 - 3. 1987, Opus Graphics
 Psychoman #1. 1992, Revolutionary Comics
 Contemporary Bios: Ross Perot. 1992, Revolutionary Comics
 Rock & Roll #59: Eric Clapton. 1993, Revolutionary Comics
 Heavy Metal Monsters 3D. 1993
 Ray 3D Zone; Cherry’s Jubilee #4. 1994, Kitchen Sink Press
 NOIR #1 & 2, 1995, CryForDawn
 Pantheon #1 - 2. 1996, Archer Books and Games
 Letha Weapons #1. 1997 Revisionary Press
 Wild Kingdom #12. 2001 (artist, letterer), MU Press
 Felecia Adult Star Stories #1. 2002, Hippy Comix
 Sex Squad #1 & 2. 2003, Carnal Comics
 Jenna Jameson Collection. 2004, Carnal Comics
 Carnal Comics: Inside Story. 2004, Carnal Comics
 Djustine - Twisted West #1. 2004, Carnal Comics
 Sex Squad #2. 2004, Carnal Comics
 Wild! #13/Minkenstein #1. 2005, MU Press
 Aurora Snow Bio Comic # 1. 2009, Carnal Comics
 Girl Meets Tentacle #1. 2010, Carnal Comics
 Underground Comix Price Guide Supplement. 2010, Hippy Comix
 City of the Gods: Forgotten. 2011, Raven Press
 The Last Goddess. 2011, Raven Press
 Mythic Tales: City of the Gods. 2011, Raven Press
 One Day in Hell #1. 2012, 3nd N Press
 Pantheon of the Gods. 2012, Raven Press
 Lost Comics of SS Crompton. 2013, Opus Graphics
 This Conquered Earth. 2013, Opus Graphics
 Fogel's Underground Comix Price Guide. 2015, Hippy Comix
 Twisted Tales of the West #1. 2020, Carnal Comics

Pen name
Crompton has written a series of novels and short stories under the pen name M. Scott Verne. Currently these works are all related to the City of the Gods: Forgotten novels and other related books/games.

References

Further reading
 UGY3K Underground Comix, December 1999, pg 136. Biography of S.S. Crompton. 
 Don & Maggie Thompson, July 1993, Comic-Book Superstars, pg 47. Steven S Crompton.
 Brent Frankenhoff, Standard Catalog of Comic Books, pg 333. Spotlight on Demi the Demoness. 
 Underground Comix Price Guide, January 2006, pg 49.  SS Crompton overview.

External links 
 
 Official Steve Crompton website 
 City of the Gods Universe

1962 births
Arizona State University alumni
Canadian comics artists
Canadian comics writers
Living people